Sabine Kalter (28 March 1889 in Jarosław – 1 September 1957 in London) was a British mezzo-soprano singer, mostly operatic. She made her professional opera debut at the Vienna Volksoper in 1911. From 1915–34 she was a leading artist at the Hamburg State Opera. She was married to Max Aufrichtig (1879–1950), a banker in Hamburg. Their son, Keith Andrews (1920–1989), was a leading British museum curator. The family fled Nazi Germany in 1934 and settled in London.

She was committed to the Royal Opera House in London from 1935–39. After 1939 she no longer appeared in operas, but still performed in concerts and recitals in London. She taught singing in London during the 1940s and 1950s.

References

1889 births
1957 deaths
Operatic mezzo-sopranos
20th-century Polish women opera singers
20th-century British women opera singers